Esquire Theater is a historic movie theater located at Cape Girardeau, Missouri.  It was built in 1946–1947, and is a two-story, brick building with a colorful Art Deco facade. The building measures approximately 100 feet by 60 feet. It features a projecting marquee with neon tube lights; a streamlined, curving entrance and ticket booth; a projecting proscenium-like arch; and embellishments including enameled and stainless steel, structural pigmented glass, marble and glass blocks.

It was listed on the National Register of Historic Places in 2005. It is located in the Broadway Commercial Historic District.

References

External links

Cinema Treasures

Individually listed contributing properties to historic districts on the National Register in Missouri
Theatres on the National Register of Historic Places in Missouri
Art Deco architecture in Missouri
Theatres completed in 1947
Buildings and structures in Cape Girardeau County, Missouri
National Register of Historic Places in Cape Girardeau County, Missouri